Sagittaria lancifolia, the bulltongue arrowhead, is a perennial, monocot plant  in the family Alismataceae, genus Sagittaria, with herbaceous growth patterns. It is native to the southeastern United States. It is known from every coastal state from Delaware to Texas. The species is also considered native to Mexico, Central America, the West Indies and northern South America. It has become naturalized on the Island of Java in Indonesia.

A common name is "duck potato" because of the large potato-like corms which can form underground.

Description

The plant is conspicuous for its large, lance-shaped leaves which grow up from  underground rhizomes and its showy, white three-petaled flowers which form at the end of long, thick stalks.  Each flower has three green sepals, three white or pink-tinged petals, at least six stamens, and  pistils which may be in separate flowers.   The plant likes to grow in fresh or brackish water and is commonly found in ditches, marshes, swamps and along the shores of lakes and streams.

Sagittaria lancifolia reproduces both asexually through spreading  rhizomes and sexually through  reproduction of copious achenes, a dry fruit each of which carries a single seed. The achenes are  dispersed through  animal vectors and  through hydrochory (dispersal through wind, water, or gravity). The achenes germinate only under light, and with or without available fluid,  but the period of their germination is shorter when they are submersed in water. Germination is reduced in anaerobic conditions. Growth is also dependent on temperature.

Sensitivity to in-situ burning of applied crude oil
Louisiana is one of the top five U.S. states in oil production, oil that is piped through marshes in Louisiana to market and sometimes leaks into the marsh land polluting it. Field studies suggest that, although the application and burning of South Louisiana Crude oil on  Sagittaria l. plants in plots of fresh Louisiana  marsh land  had short term negative effects on the growth rate of Sagittaria l., over time plant recovery was just as rapid as in the plots where the plants were oiled but not burned. This suggests that allowing a polluted marsh to degrade and recover without burning is a viable option, while burning is a viable option when a rapid recovery is needed on sensitive lands.

Notes

External links

lancifolia
Plants described in 1759
Aquatic plants
Flora of North America
Flora of South America
Taxa named by Carl Linnaeus